The 1899 Princeton Tigers football team represented Princeton University in the 1899 college football season. The team finished with a 12–1 record and was retroactively named as the national champion by the Billingsley Report and Parke H. Davis. Harvard compiled a 10–0–1 record and was selected as the national champion by three other selectors. They outscored their opponents 185 to 21.

Schedule

References

Princeton
Princeton Tigers football seasons
College football national champions
Princeton Tigers football